Marie Gülich (born 28 May 1994) is a German professional basketball player who is currently a free agent. She was drafted 12th overall by the Phoenix Mercury in the 2018 WNBA draft. Gülich played center for the Oregon State Beavers women's basketball team in college. During the 2019 WNBA Draft she was traded to the Atlanta Dream for the 11th overall pick Brianna Turner.

WNBA career statistics

Regular season

|-
| style="text-align:left;"| 2018
| style="text-align:left;"| Phoenix
| 23 || 0 || 5.0 || .483 || .000 || .750 || 1.0 || 0.1 || 0.0 || 0.6 || 1.5
|-
| style="text-align:left;"| 2019
| style="text-align:left;"| Atlanta
| 31 || 1 || 11.3  || .361 || .320 || .727 || 2.7 || 0.6 || 0.2 || 1.0 || 3.3
|-
| style="text-align:left;"| 2020
| style="text-align:left;"| Los Angeles
| 12 || 1 || 9.9 || .500  || .000 || 1.000 || 1.5 || 0.6 || 0.3 || 0.4 || 2.4
|- class="sortbottom"
| style="text-align:left;"| Career
| style="text-align:left;"|3 years, 3 team
| 66 || 2 || 8.8 || .405 || .286 || .758 || 1.9 || 0.4 || 0.2 || 0.5 || 2.5

References 

1994 births
Living people
Atlanta Dream players
Centers (basketball)
German expatriate basketball people in the United States
German women's basketball players
Los Angeles Sparks players
Oregon State Beavers women's basketball players
People from Altenkirchen
Phoenix Mercury draft picks
Phoenix Mercury players
Sportspeople from Rhineland-Palatinate